Constantine Sandis FRSA (born 1 October 1976) is a Greek and British philosopher and entrepreneur. Having worked on philosophy of action, moral psychology, David Hume, and Ludwig Wittgenstein, in 2013 he became the UK's youngest Professor of Philosophy, aged 36. He is currently Professor of Philosophy at the University of Hertfordshire and a Founding Director of author services firm Lex Academic.

Biography
Sandis read Literae Humaniores at St Anne’s College, University of Oxford, where he was taught by Gabriele Taylor, Roger Crisp, Alison Denham, and A.C. Grayling, as well as Peter Hacker at St John's College, Oxford, Katherine Morris at Mansfield College, Oxford, and Hugh Rice at Christ Church, Oxford. He received his Ph.D. from the University of Reading (2005), under the supervision of Jonathan Dancy. Having worked at Oxford Brookes University from 2005 to 2015, he subsequently moved to Hertfordshire. He is also the editor of Why Philosophy Matters, Anthem Studies in Wittgenstein  and "Philosophers in Depth". Sandis writes a quarterly opinion column for  The Philosophers' Magazine, contributes  to Times Higher Education and  The Times Literary Supplement, and frequently appears as a guest on radio programmes such as The Moral Maze, Analysis, and Free Thinking. He is Secretary of the British Wittgenstein Society and a Research Associate at the Waterloo Institute for Hellenic Studies  and CRÉ - University of Montreal. He is married to Lex Academic CEO Louise Chapman.

Research
Sandis' research has primarily focused on the philosophy of action but he has also written about reasons, moral psychology, and understanding, as well as exegetical accounts of related works by Hume, Hegel, Anscombe, and Wittgenstein. His 2012 book The Things We Do and Why We Do Them argues for a pluralist account of actions and their explanations, and includes the controversial view that the reasons for which we act cannot in themselves explain why any action occurs. Since then he has published numerous articles defending the view that understanding others is not reducible to obtaining information about their 'mental contents' and that, consequently, no theory about the nature of such access can account for understanding others, which requires the sharing of behaviour. He has also collaborated with Microsoft Research on designing intelligible AI  and co-written papers on the ethics of risk-taking with Nassim Nicholas Taleb. More recently, he has been writing philosophical essays on rock music, especially that of Bob Dylan.

Publications

Books

New Essays on the Explanation of Action, Palgrave Macmillan, 2009. 
A Companion to the Philosophy of Action, with Timothy O'Connor, Wiley-Blackwell, 2010. 
Hegel on Action, with Arto Laitinen, Palgrave Macmillan, 2010. 
The Things We Do and Why We Do Them, Palgrave Macmillan, 2012.
Human Nature, with Mark Cain, Cambridge University Press, 2012. 
Reasons and Causes: Causalism and Anti-Causalim in the Philosophy of Action, with Giuseppina D'Oro, Palgrave Macmillan, 2013.
Cultural Heritage Ethics: Between Theory and Practice, Open Book Publishers, 2014.
Philosophy of Action: An Anthology, with Jonathan Dancy, Wiley-Blackwell, 2015.
Philosophy of Action from Suarez to Anscombe, Routledge, 2018.
Character and Causation: Hume's Philosophy of Action, Routledge, 2019.
Raisons et responsabilité: Essais de philosophie de l’action, Ithaque, 2021.
Dylan at 80, with Gary Browning, Imprint Academic, 2021.
Extending Hinge Epistemology, with Daniele Moyal-Sharrock, Anthem Press, 2022.

Articles

 . 
 . 
 ‘Who Are 'We' for Wittgenstein?’ in (ed. H. Appelqvist),Wittgenstein and the Limits of Language (Routledge, 2019), Ch.8. 
 ‘Are Reasons Like Shampoo?’ in (ed. G. Schumann),Explanation in Action Theory and Historiography (Routledge, 2019), Ch.8. 

 

 
 
 
 ‘‘Can Action Explanations Ever be Non-Factive?’’ in (eds B. Hooker, M. Little, and D. Backhurst), Thinking about Reasons (OUP, 2013), pp.29-49. 

‘The Experimental Turn and Ordinary Language’, Essays in Philosophy, Vol 11. No 2. (July 2010), 181-96.

References

External links 
 Academia  
 Medium  
 University of Hertfordshire 
 Personal Website 
 Lex Academic 

1976 births
21st-century Greek philosophers
Academics of the University of Hertfordshire
Action theorists
Analytic philosophers
Living people